Woodrow Memorial Presbyterian Church (also known as Bishop's Memorial A.M.E. Church) is a historic church in Columbia, South Carolina.

It was built in 1885 and added to the National Register of Historic Places in 1979. In addition to its National Register of Historic Places status, Woodrow Memorial falls within the boundaries of Waverly Protection Area, a Preservation District within the City of Columbia Urban Design and Historic Preservation District system, as well as in Waverly Historic District.

References

Churches on the National Register of Historic Places in South Carolina
Churches completed in 1885
19th-century Presbyterian church buildings in the United States
Churches in Columbia, South Carolina
African Methodist Episcopal churches in South Carolina
Presbyterian churches in South Carolina
National Register of Historic Places in Columbia, South Carolina